The Year 345 (CCCXLV) was a common year starting on Tuesday (link will display the full calendar) of the Julian calendar. At the time, it was known as the Year of the Consulship of Amantius and Albinus (or, less frequently, year 1098 Ab urbe condita). The denomination 345 for this year has been used ever since the early medieval period, when the Anno Domini calendar era became the prevalent method in Europe for naming years.

Events 
 By place 

 India 
 Merchant Knai Thomman and 400 followers visit the Malabar Coast in Kerala (India), and assist the church there.
 The Kadamba Dynasty is founded by Mayurasharma.

 Italy 
 Constans orders the Basilica di Santa Tecla to be constructed in Lombardy.

Births 
 Evagrius Ponticus, Christian monk and ascetic (d. 399)
 Afranius Syagrius, Roman politician and administrator
 Quintus Aurelius Symmachus, Roman consul and intellectual (d. 402)
 Tyrannius of Aquileia, historian and theologian (approximate date)

Deaths 

 February 4 – Abraham of Arbela, Persian bishop and martyr (approximate date)
 April 6
 Abdecalas – Persian Orthodox priest and saint
 Shemon Bar Sabbae – Persian Orthodox priest and saint
 June 16 – Patriarch Gregory of Cappadocia
 August 27 – Narnus, Roman Catholic bishop and saint
 November 20 – Abiatha, Hathes and Mamlacha, Syrian Orthodox priests, virgins, martyrs and saints

Date unknown 
 Abdisho, member of the Church of the East
 Aphrahat, Syrian Orthodox priest and saint
 Stephen I of Antioch, Byzantine bishop and saint

References